State Road 120 (SR 120) is a state highway in the U.S. state of Florida. Known as North 23rd Avenue, the state highway runs  from U.S. Route 441 (US 441) east to SR 24 within Gainesville.

Route description
SR 120 begins at an intersection with US 441 (N.W. 13th Street north of downtown Gainesville; N.W. 23rd Avenue continues west of the intersection as an unnumbered street. SR 120 heads east as a four-lane undivided highway through a mixed residential and commercial area. The highway intersects SR 20 (N.W. 6th Street) and enters the northeast quadrant of Gainesville at an abandoned rail line. East of the address axis, SR 120 intersects County Road 329 (Main Street) and continues through a residential area. The highway reaches its eastern terminus at an intersection with SR 24 (Waldo Road). The roadway continues east across the Waldo Road Greenway, which parallels the eastbound side of SR 24, to a gate for the Tacachale developmental disability community.

Major intersections

References

120
120
120